Shawsheen Valley Regional Vocational Technical High School is located in Billerica, Massachusetts, United States. "Shawsheen Tech", or "Shaw Tech" is a public high school serving 5 towns: Burlington, Wilmington, Bedford, Tewksbury and Billerica making up most of the student body.

Vocational/technical programs 

 Auto Collision Repair & Refinishing
 Automotive Technology
 Business Technology/Marketing
 Carpentry
 Cosmetology
 Culinary Arts
 Dental Assisting
 Design & Visual Communications
 Drafting
 Electricity
 Electronics/Robotics
 Graphic Communications
 HVAC-R (Heating-Ventilation-Air Conditioning-Refrigeration)
 Health Assisting
 Information Support Services & Networking/Programming and Web Development
 Machine Tool Technology
 Masonry & Tile Setting
 Medical Assisting
 Metal Fabrication & Joining Technologies
 Plumbing

References

External links
 

Commonwealth Athletic Conference
Billerica, Massachusetts
Schools in Middlesex County, Massachusetts
Public high schools in Massachusetts